The 1923 Columbus Tigers season was their fourth in the league and first season as the Tigers. The team improved on their previous output of 0–8, winning five games. They finished eighth in the league.

Schedule

Standings

References

Columbus Tigers seasons
Columbus Tigers
Columbus Tigers